Scarabeo 8 is an ultra deepwater 6th generation semi-submersible drilling rig. It is owned and operated by Saipem.  The vessel is registered in Nassau, Bahamas.

Description 
Scarabeo 8 is an ultra deepwater 6th generation semi-submersible drilling rigs. It is designed by Moss Maritime and its design type is CS50 MKII.

Its gross tonnage is 35,304, dead weight tonnage 14,508, and net tonnage 10,592 tonnes. The vessel is made up of two hulls, six columns and a main deck where the drilling plant and platform services are installed. It has 128 single cabins for accommodation. With some doubles, allowing for 140 personnel in total. The rig is equipped with two deck cranes and one knuckle boom. It also has a helideck suitable for Sikorsky S-61N and Sikorsky S-92 helicopters.

Construction and delivery 
The rig was ordered on 10 June 2005.  Its hull was built at the Sevmash yard in Severodvinsk, Russia.

In 2007, the hull was moved to the shipyard in Palermo, Italy where Fincantieri carried out topsides construction.  On 24 June 2010, a fire incident took place when the fire started in the ventilation system.  The fire was believed to be an act of sabotage by workers.  No one was hurt in the incident.  However, as a result of this incident, the rig needed massive replacement of pipes, heating, ventilation, and air conditioning systems, steel details and paint.  About  of cables were replaced.

After that incident Scarabeo 8 was moved from the Fincantieri yard in Italy to Norway for repairs and final completion.  In this voyage it was towed by two tow boats.   The rig was winterized for working in Arctic conditions and commissioned in the Westcon yard in Ølensvåg.  The rig went through a sea trial period in the beginning of 2012.  It was christened on 3 April 2012.

Originally, the rig was to be ready in the third quarter of 2009.  However, due to different accidents and delays it was commissioned only in 2012.  The license to drill in Norwegian waters was delayed several times due to non-conformities with Norwegian regulations.  Non-conformities were found in areas such as the management system for use of lifting equipment, offshore cranes for pipe handling, emergency operation of lifting appliances, access to electrical equipment, safety barriers, storage facility for helicopter fuel, as well as design-related issues covering materials handling and working environment.  In October 2011, a contract worker working at the construction was killed by a fatal accident.

Operations 
The first well to drill by Scarabeo 8 is at the Statoil-operated Odden prospect in the North Sea. After that, the rig will drill at the Eni-operated Salina and Bonna prospects in the Barents Sea before starting drilling at the Eni-operated Goliat field.

On 4 September 2012 the rig, drilling at the Salina prospect, was reported as having a 5.7-degree list caused by seawater coming into the ballast water tank.

References 

2007 ships
Drilling rigs
Semi-submersibles
Ships built by Sevmash
Ships built in Italy
Ships built in Norway
Ships of the Bahamas
Eni
Ships built by Fincantieri